Little Wratting is a small village and civil parish in the West Suffolk district of Suffolk in eastern England. Located on the north-eastern edge of Haverhill, in 2005 its population was 160.

References

Villages in Suffolk
Civil parishes in Suffolk
Borough of St Edmundsbury